René Koch (1 February 1895 – 5 January 1978) was a French sports shooter. He competed in the 50 m pistol event at the 1936 Summer Olympics.

References

1895 births
1978 deaths
French male sport shooters
Olympic shooters of France
Shooters at the 1936 Summer Olympics
Place of birth missing